Italy competed at the 2012 Summer Olympics in London, from 27 July to 12 August 2012. This nation has competed at every Summer Olympic Games in the modern era, except for the 1904 Summer Olympics in St. Louis. The Italian National Olympic Committee (Italian: Comitato Olimpico Nazionale Italiano, CONI) sent the nation's smallest delegation to the Games since the 1988 Summer Olympics in Seoul. A total of 285 athletes, 162 men and 123 women, competed in 22 sports.

Italy left London with a total of 28 Olympic medals (8 gold, 9 silver, and 11 bronze), finishing eighth in the overall medal standings. Seven of these medals were awarded to the athletes in fencing, five in shooting, and three in boxing. Six Italian athletes won more than a single Olympic medal in London. After suffering a major setback from Beijing, Italy's team-based athletes recaptured their success at these games as the men's water polo team and the men's indoor volleyball team won silver and bronze medals respectively. For the first time since 1984, Italy did not win an Olympic medal in swimming, except for the open water marathon.

Among the nation's medalists were shooters Niccolò Campriani and Jessica Rossi, who broke an Olympic and a world record to win gold medals in their respective events. Two Italian athletes won gold medals for the first time in Olympic history: archer Michele Frangilli, who competed at his fifth Olympics, in team archery, and taekwondo jin Carlo Molfetta in men's super heavyweight division. Foil fencer Valentina Vezzali, who won gold and bronze in London, became one of the most successful Italian athletes in history, with a total of eight Olympic medals. Meanwhile, boxer Clemente Russo managed to repeat his silver medal from Beijing.

Medalists

| width="78%" align="left" valign="top" |

| width="22%" align="left" valign="top" |

Delegation 
Comitato Olimpico Nazionale Italiano (CONI) selected a team of 285 athletes, 162 men and 123 women, to compete in 22 sports; it was the nation's smallest team sent to the Olympics since 1988. Italy did not qualify teams in basketball, field hockey, football, and handball. There was only a single competitor in badminton, track cycling, BMX cycling, equestrian dressage, trampoline gymnastics, weightlifting, and Greco-Roman wrestling.

The Italian team featured past Olympic champions, four of them defending (super heavyweight boxer Roberto Cammarelle, foil fencer Valentina Vezzali, judoka Giulia Quintavalle, and freestyle swimmer Federica Pellegrini). Vezzali, who competed at her fifth Olympics as the most experienced athlete, became Italy's first female flag bearer at the opening ceremony since 1996.

Two naturalized Italian athletes made their multiple Olympic appearances as individuals. Sprint kayaker Josefa Idem, the oldest of the team at age 47, became the first female athlete to compete in eight Olympic Games, although she played for the former West Germany in her first two appearances. Archer Natalia Valeeva, on the other hand, competed at her sixth Olympics as an individual athlete, having played under three different banners (the other two were the Unified Team and her native land Moldova). Along with Valeeva, two other Italian athletes made their sixth Olympic appearance: trap shooter Giovanni Pellielo and windsurfer and four-time Olympic medalist Alessandra Sensini. Along with Vezzali, three other athletes made their fifth Olympic appearance: archer Michele Frangilli, sabre fencer and two-time world champion Luigi Tarantino, and skeet shooter and former Olympic gold medalist Ennio Falco. Meanwhile, gymnast Erika Fasana, at age 16, was the youngest athlete of the team.

Other notable Italian athletes featured taekwondo jin and Olympic silver medalist Mauro Sarmiento, sabre fencer and former Olympic gold medalist Aldo Montano, and rifle shooter and multiple-time World Cup champion Niccolò Campriani.

| width=78% align=left valign=top |
The following is the list of number of competitors participating in the Games:

Archery

Qualified six athletes.

Men

Women

Athletics

Italian athletes have so far achieved qualifying standards in the following athletics events (up to a maximum of 3 athletes in each event at the 'A' Standard, and 1 at the 'B' Standard):

On June 30, 39 Italian athletes were qualified with the A Standard, or as first 12 team relay, reduced to 38 because of an injury waiver for the champion of high jump (5 medals in international competitions 1st level), Antonietta Di Martino. On August 8, Alex Schwazer, the defending Olympic champion in the men's 50 km race walk, was disqualified after he failed the doping test for using the blood-boosting agent recombinant erythropoietin (rhEPO).

Key
 Note – Ranks given for track events are within the athlete's heat only
 Q = Qualified for the next round
 q = Qualified for the next round as a fastest loser or, in field events, by position without achieving the qualifying target
 NR = National record
 N/A = Round not applicable for the event
 Bye = Athlete not required to compete in round

Men
Track & road events

Field events

Women
Track & road events

Field events

Badminton

Boxing

Italy has so far qualified boxers for the following events

Men

Canoeing

Eight Italian athletes have qualified for the following events.

Slalom

Sprint

Qualification Legend: FA = Qualify to final (medal); FB = Qualify to final B (non-medal)

Cycling

Road
Men

Women

Track
Omnium

Mountain biking

BMX

Diving

Eight divers qualified.

Men

Women

Equestrian

Dressage

Eventing

Fencing

Italy has qualified 15 fencers.
Men

Women

Gymnastics

Artistic
Men
Team

Individual finals

Women
Team

Individual finals

Rhythmic

Trampoline

Judo

Italy has qualified 9 judokas.

Men

Women

Modern pentathlon

Italy has qualified 2 men and 2 women.

Rowing

Italy has qualified the following boats.

Men

Women

Qualification Legend: FA=Final A (medal); FB=Final B (non-medal);  SA/B=Semifinals A/B; R=Repechage

Sailing

Italy has so far qualified 1 boat for each of the following events.

Men

Women

Open

M = Medal race; EL = Eliminated – did not advance into the medal race;

Shooting

Italy has gained fifteen quota places in the shooting events;

Men

Women

Swimming

Italian swimmers have so far achieved qualifying standards in the following events (up to a maximum of 2 swimmers in each event at the Olympic Qualifying Time (OQT), and 1 at the Olympic Selection Time (OST): In the list, the names of the swimmers qualified at an individual event.

Men

Women

Synchronized swimming

Italy has qualified 2 quota places in synchronized swimming.

Table tennis 

Italy has qualified the following table tennis players.

Taekwondo

Mauro Sarmiento has ensured a quota place for Italy in the men's −80 kg by reaching the top 3 of the 2011 WTF World Qualification Tournament.  Italy also qualified in the men's +80 kg during the European Championships.

Tennis

Italy had qualified players from the top 54 rankings of ATP and WTA rankings (up to 4 players per nation, with the possibility of forming two teams of doubles) at the end of 2012 French Open, on 11 June 2012.

Men 

Women 

Mixed

Triathlon

Three athletes have qualified for the Italian team.

Volleyball

Beach

Indoor
Italy has qualified both a men's and women's team for the indoor tournaments.

 Men's team event – 1 team of 12 players
 Women's team event – 1 team of 12 players

Men's tournament

Roster

Group play

Quarterfinal

Semifinal

Bronze medal match

Women's tournament

Roster

Group play

Quarterfinals

Water polo

Men's tournament

Team roster

Group play

Quarterfinal

Semifinal

Gold medal game

Women's tournament

Group play

Quarter-final

5–8th place semifinals

Seventh place game

Weightlifting

Italy has qualified the following quota places.

Wrestling

Italy has qualified 1 quota.

Key:
  – Victory by Fall.
  – Decision by Points – the loser with technical points.
  – Decision by Points – the loser without technical points.

Men's Greco-Roman

References

External links

Nations at the 2012 Summer Olympics
2012
2012 in Italian sport